Yangbeihu, formerly known as Xinqiao, is a metro station on Line 6 of the Hangzhou Metro in China. It was opened on 30 December 2020, together with the Line 6. The station changed its name from "Xinqiao" to "Yangbeihu" on 30 April 2021.It is located near the Yangbei Lake wetland park in the Fuyang District of Hangzhou.

References 

Hangzhou Metro stations